Compsomantis is a genus of praying mantids in the family Gonypetidae.

Species are found in South-East Asia and well represented in Indonesia and the Philippines. Species include:
Compsomantis ceylonica
Compsomantis crassiceps
Compsomantis mindoroensis
Compsomantis robusta
Compsomantis semirufula
Compsomantis tumidiceps

See also
List of mantis genera and species

References

 
Insects of Asia
Gonypetidae